Amblytelus niger is a species of ground beetle in the subfamily Psydrinae. It was described by Sloane in 1920.

See also
Amblytelus
Amblytelus balli
Amblytelus cooki
Psydrinae
Carabidae

References

Amblytelus
Beetles described in 1920